Richard G. Newman is an engineer and businessman. He was president, CEO and chairman emeritus for AECOM (NYSE:ACM), a  United States provider of professional technical and management support services. Newman led the launch of AECOM as an independent company in 1990 and served as chief executive officer through September 2005. He led an employee and management purchase of AECOM's original companies from Ashland Corp.

Prior to the launch of AECOM, he served as president of Ashland Technology Corp. as well as DMJM, an architecture, engineering and construction services firm, both before and after it was acquired by Ashland in 1984. Earlier, Newman served as president of Genge, one of the first publicly traded architectural and engineering firms.

Newman is also a director of Southwest Water Company, Sempra Energy Co. and 13 mutual funds under Capital Research and Management Co.

Education
Bucknell University, Class of 1956, Bachelor of Science in Civil Engineering.
Master of Science degree at Columbia University, 1960.
executive management graduate work at the University of California, Los Angeles.

References

External links
 Forbes.com (Archived on November 11, 2006)
 AECOM Biography
 Bucknell Engineering Association

American businesspeople
21st-century American engineers
Bucknell University alumni
Columbia School of Engineering and Applied Science alumni
Living people
UCLA Anderson School of Management alumni
Year of birth missing (living people)